Flute Concerto (Ibert) was written by composer Jacques Ibert in 1932. The concerto comprises 3 movements (Allegro, Andante, and Allegro scherzando), and was first performed in 1934 in Paris at the Société des Concerts du Conservatoire. The piece was dedicated to Marcel Moyse, and features flute as the soloist lead instrument, along with small orchestra.

Instrumentation
The concerto is scored for solo flute, two flutes, two oboes, two clarinets, two bassoons, two horns, trumpet, timpani and strings. A typical performance lasts about 20 minutes.

References

External links

Compositions by Jacques Ibert
Ibert
1932 compositions